Melaniparus is a genus of birds in the tit family. The species were formerly placed in the speciose genus Parus but were moved to Melaniparus based on a molecular phylogenetic analysis published in 2013 that showed that the members formed a distinct clade. The genus Melaniparus had originally been introduced by the French naturalist Charles Lucien Bonaparte in 1850. The type species was subsequently designated as the southern black tit (Melaniparus niger). The name of the genus combines the Ancient Greek melas, melanos "black" and the genus Parus introduced by Carl Linnaeus in 1758.

The following species, all from Africa and mostly having dark plumage, have been placed in the genus:

References

 
Bird genera
Paridae
 
Taxa named by Charles Lucien Bonaparte